The Ungrateful Heart is a 1951 Italian melodrama film directed by Guido Brignone and starring Carla Del Poggio,  Frank Latimore and Gabriele Ferzetti. It takes its name from the Neapolitan song "Core 'ngrato". It was released in West Germany in 1953.

The film's sets were designed by the art director Piero Filippone.

Cast

References

Bibliography
 Forgacs, David & Gundle, Stephen. Mass Culture and Italian Society from Fascism to the Cold War. Indiana University Press, 2007.

External links

1951 films
1951 drama films
Italian drama films
1950s Italian-language films
Films directed by Guido Brignone
Melodrama films
Italian black-and-white films
1950s Italian films